HMS Barbara was an Adonis class schooner of the Royal Navy and launched in 1806. A French privateer captured her in 1807 and she became the French privateer Pératy. The Royal Navy recaptured her in 1808. She was paid off in June 1814 and sold in February 1815.

Capture
Barbara was commissioned under the command of Lieutenant Edward A. D'Arcey.

On 14 September 1807 Barbara was returning to Demerara from Devils Island when she sighted a brig making for her. When the brig did not return the recognition signals D'Arcey sailed away, with the brig in chase. Next morning the brig resumed the chase. By mid-afternoon it was apparent that Barbara could not escape so D'Arcey turned to engage his pursuer. An engagement followed; after a well-contested action of half an hour the French were able to board and capture Barbara. The British lost four men killed and six wounded, two mortally.

The French brig was the privateer Général Ernouf, which was under the command of Captain Alexis Grassin. The French then took Barbara into Guadalupe, where her new owners gave her the name Pératy, intending to use her as a privateer.

Recapture
In July 1808, the master of an American brig claimed the protection of a convoy from Jamaica, which the 64-gun HMS Veteran was escorting. The American traveled with the convoy for part of its journey, but 24 hours after leaving its protection, he betrayed the convoy's strength and course to the French. The French privateer cutter Pératy, under the command of M. Maurison (or Moriseau), took up position in the convoy's path, hoping to capture some of the ships.  surprised and captured the privateer on 17 July after a chase lasting 24 hours. The privateer was found to be the former Barbara. The French prize crew had sailed Barbara on to Charlestown, where she had been refitted. As Pératy, she had sailed again on 10 July having been furnished with supplies and provisions for three months of raiding. Pératy was armed with twelve 18-pounder carronades and had a crew of 90 men.

A prize crew took Pératy to Halifax, Nova Scotia, where the Admiralty purchased her and took her back into service. Admiral Sir John Borlase Warren renamed her Somers, after Admiral Sir George Somers, but the Admiralty over-ruled the renaming and Somerss name reverted to Barbara.

British service
In 1809 Lieutenant George Duncan took command and sailed Barbara on the North American station. His replacement, in 1812, was Lieutenant William Douglas, who sailed her on the Downs station.

In March 1812 Lieutenant James Morgan assumed command. He spent the rest of the year cruising of the north-west coast of Ireland, and then off Boulogne. At daybreak on 11 February 1813, Barbara found herself some three miles from the Boulogne pier and near an anchored French lugger. Morgan sailed towards the lugger, which had 14 guns, with the aim of capturing her. The lugger immediately cut her cables and made to join six other luggers, each armed with eight to 14 guns. The French vessels opened fire, attempting to prevent Barbaras escape. Barbara returned fire and repulsed two attempts to board her. At 9:15 am, the French vessels, having sustained four men killed and 11 wounded, including two mortally, retreated. Barbara, though much shot up, had no casualties. The next day she drove a lugger ashore and destroyed it.

The next month Barbara joined Rear-Admiral George Hope's squadron and with it sailed to the Baltic. This marked the start of a busy period for her.

A month later, on 13 April, Barbara was at Aalborg where she cut out of the anchorage a ship of 400 tons, two galliots, and a sloop, loaded with grain for the Norwegian market. She escaped with these prizes though nine Danish gunboats pursued her, fortunately never quite getting within range of their guns.
Next she moved to the entrance of the Kattegat, where she spent several months skirmishing with Danish naval vessels and flying batteries on shore. On 18 June Barbara boarded and examined a licensed Danish merchantman while being fired on by three brigs of the Danish navy, and six gunboats.

Then on 3 July near Fladstrand Barbara engaged in an inconclusive engagement with the Danish praam Norge, which was supported by several other vessels. Norge, of 80 men, was armed with two 32-pounder guns and six 18-pounder carronades. The next day Barbara drove a sloop on shore near The Skaw. Later that month Barbara visited Flagstrand under a flag of truce and anchored near Norge. Her captain remarked that now that he had had the opportunity to see Barbara more closely he knew how to deal with her in the future. Morgan received permission to replace two of her 18-pounder carronades with two 6-pounder bow chasers.

The next month, on 11 August, 26 of Barbaras men in her boats landed on Great Grasholm island. There they destroyed a signal station and a battery of two guns. The Danes did not resist and so there were no casualties on either side. That same day Barbara again engaged Norge and some other vessels in another inconclusive action. Although Barbara only suffered one man wounded, she was badly damaged and had to put into Hawk roads, Gothenburg. While her crew was repairing her she took on so much water that she sank. Morgan was able to refloat her a few days later. Barbara again visited Flagstrand under a flag of truce. There he encountered an officer from Norge who reported that the last encounter with Barbara had cost Norge three men killed and six wounded.

In the early evening of 6 October, Lieutenant Richard Banks of the gun-brig  received intelligence that a Danish privateer of one gun was sailing towards an anchorage about four miles from Wingo Sound near Goteborg that English merchantmen were wont to use. Forward was in company with Barbara so when Banks set out in a boat with six or seven men, Morgan joined him in a boat with an equal handful. The British found the Dane at about 9:15 pm. The Danish vessel was armed with a howitzer and had a crew of 25 men. The British succeeded in capturing the vessel, killing five Danes and wounding the captain, a lieutenant, in their attack; British losses consisted of two men killed and three wounded, including Morgan.

Three days later, Barbara was in the company of the privateer Hawke, of Hastings. Two gigs from Hawke captured the Danish privateer Aalberg and recaptured her prize near Laeso despite fire from the guns of three Danish gunboats and ten privateers. The recaptured vessel was the Prussian bark Emma.

On 23 November Barbara captured the Danish brig Wenskabet. Four days later she captured Minerva. Sometime thereafter Barbara returned to Britain. In her nine months in the Baltic she captured or destroyed 2,544 tons (bm) of shipping, and captured 136 seamen.

Fate
Barbara returned to Plymouth and was paid off in June 1814. (Morgan resigned his commission in July to return to Gothenburg to salvage what he could of his affairs following the bankruptcy of his prize agents there.) Barbara was offered for sale at Woolwich on 9 February 1815, and was sold on that day for £610.

Notes

Citations

References

 
 
 
 
  

 

1806 ships
Adonis-class schooners
Captured ships
Privateer ships of France
Ships built in Bermuda
Maritime incidents in 1807